Anna Julia Haywood Cooper (August 10, 1858February 27, 1964) was an American author, educator, sociologist, speaker, Black liberation activist, and one of the most prominent African-American scholars in United States history.

Born into slavery in 1858, Cooper went on to receive a world-class education and claim power and prestige in academic and social circles. In 1924,  she received her PhD from the Sorbonne, University of Paris. Cooper became the fourth African-American woman to earn a doctoral degree. She was also a prominent member of Washington, D.C.'s African-American community and a member of Alpha Kappa Alpha sorority.

Cooper made contributions to social science fields, particularly in sociology. Her first book, A Voice from the South: By a Black Woman of the South, is widely acknowledged as one of the first articulations of Black feminism, giving Cooper the often-used title of "the Mother of Black Feminism".

Biography

Childhood 
Anna "Annie" Julia Haywood was born enslaved in Raleigh, North Carolina, in 1858. She and her mother, Hannah Stanley Haywood, were held in bondage by George Washington Haywood (1802–1890), one of the sons of North Carolina's longest serving state Treasurer John Haywood, who helped found the University of North Carolina, but whose estate later was forced to repay missing funds. Either George, in whose household her mother worked in bondage, or his brother, Dr. Fabius Haywood, in whose household her older brother Andrew was enslaved, was probably Anna's father; Anna's mother refused to clarify paternity. George became state attorney for Wake County, North Carolina and with a brother owned a plantation in Greene County, Alabama.

Cooper worked as a domestic servant in the Haywood home and had two older brothers, Andrew J. Haywood and Rufus Haywood. Andrew, enslaved by Fabius J. Haywood, later served in the Spanish–American War. Rufus was also born enslaved and became the leader of the musical group Stanley's Band.

Education

In 1868, when Cooper was nine years old, she received a scholarship and began her education at the newly opened Saint Augustine's Normal School and Collegiate Institute in Raleigh, founded by the local Episcopal diocese for the purpose of training teachers to educate the formerly enslaved and their families. The Reverend J. Brinton offered Cooper a scholarship to help pay for her expenses. According to Mark S. Giles, a Cooper biographer, "the educational levels offered at St. Augustine ranged from primary to high school, including trade-skill training." During her 14 years at St. Augustine's, she distinguished herself as a bright and ambitious student who showed equal promise in both liberal arts and analytical disciplines such as mathematics and science; her subjects included languages (Latin, French, Greek), English literature, math, and science. Although the school had a special track reserved for women – dubbed the "Ladies' Course" – and the administration actively discouraged women from pursuing higher-level courses, Cooper fought for her right to take a course reserved for men, by demonstrating her scholastic ability. During this period, St. Augustine's pedagogical emphasis was on training young men for the ministry and preparing them for additional training at four-year universities. One of these men, George A. C. Cooper, would later become her husband. He died after only two years of marriage.

Cooper's academic excellence enabled her to work as a tutor for younger children, which also helped her pay for her educational expenses. After completing her studies, she remained at the institution as an instructor. In the 1883–1884 school year, she taught classics, modern history, higher English, and vocal and instrumental music; she is not listed as faculty in the 1884–1885 year, but in the 1885–1886 year she is listed as "Instructor in Classic, Rhetoric, Etc." Her husband's early death may have contributed to her ability to continue teaching; if she had stayed married, she might have been encouraged or required to withdraw from the university to become a housewife.

After her husband's death, Cooper entered Oberlin College in Ohio, where she continued to follow the course of study designated for men, graduating in 1884. Given her academic qualifications, she was admitted as a sophomore. She often attempted to take four classes, rather than three as was prescribed by the college; she also was attracted to Oberlin by its reputation for music, but was unable to take as many classes in piano as she would have wished. Among her classmates were fellow black women Ida Gibbs (later Hunt) and Mary Church Terrell. At Oberlin, Cooper was part of the "LLS", "one of the two literary societies for women, whose regular programs featured lectures by distinguished speakers as well as singers and orchestras". After teaching briefly at Wilberforce College, she returned to St. Augustine's in 1885. She then went back to Oberlin and earned an M.A. in mathematics in 1888, making her one of the first two black women – along with Mary Church Terrell, who received her M.A. in the same year - to earn a master's degree. In 1890–91 she published an essay on "Higher Education of Women", which argued for the benefits of black women being trained in classical literature, referring to both Socrates and Sappho among her examples, and demonstrated an interest in access to education which would inform much of her later career. In writing this essay, she preceded W. E. B. Du Bois' similar arguments in "Of the Training of Black Men" (Souls of Black Folk 1903) by almost a decade.

In 1900 she made her first trip to Europe, to participate in the First Pan-African Conference in London. After visiting the cathedral towns of Scotland and England, she went to Paris for the World Exposition. "After a week at the Exposition she went to Oberammergau to see the Passion Play, thence to Munich and other German towns, and then to Italy through Rome, Naples, Venice, Pompeii, Mt. Vesuvius, and Florence."

Washington DC years 
She later moved to Washington, DC. In 1892, Anna Cooper, Helen Appo Cook, Ida B. Wells, Charlotte Forten Grimké, Mary Jane Peterson, Mary Church Terrell, and Evelyn Shaw formed the Colored Women's League in Washington, D.C. The goals of the service-oriented club were to promote unity, social progress and the best interests of the African-American community. Helen Cook was elected president.

Cooper would develop a close friendship with Charlotte Forten Grimké – Cooper began teaching Latin at M Street High School, becoming principal in 1901. She later became entangled in a controversy involving the differing attitudes about black education, as she advocated for a model of classical education espoused by W. E. B. Du Bois, "designed to prepare eligible students for higher education and leadership", rather than the vocational program that was promoted by Booker T. Washington. As a result of this, she left the school. Later, she was recalled to M Street, and she fit her work on her doctoral thesis into "nooks and crannies of free time".

A Voice from the South

During her years as a teacher and principal at M Street High School, Cooper also completed her first book, titled A Voice from the South: By a Black Woman of the South, published in 1892, and delivered many speeches calling for civil rights and women's rights. Perhaps her most well-known volume of writing, A Voice from the South, is widely viewed as one of the first articulations of black feminism. The book advanced a vision of self-determination through education and social uplift for African-American women. Its central thesis was that the educational, moral, and spiritual progress of black women would improve the general standing of the entire African-American community. She says that the violent natures of men often run counter to the goals of higher education, so it is important to foster more female intellectuals because they will bring more elegance to education. This view was criticized by some as submissive to the 19th-century cult of true womanhood, but others label it as one of the most important arguments for black feminism in the 19th century. Cooper advanced the view that it was the duty of educated and successful black women to support their underprivileged peers in achieving their goals. The essays in A Voice from the South also touched on a variety of topics, such as race and racism, gender, the socioeconomic realities of black families, and the administration of the Episcopal Church.

Reception 
A Voice from the South received significant praise from leaders in the black community.

Later years

Cooper was an author, educator, and public speaker. In 1893, she delivered a paper titled "The Intellectual Progress of the Colored Women of the United States since the Emancipation Proclamation" at the World's Congress of Representative Women in Chicago. She was one of five African-American women invited to speak at this event, along with: Fannie Barrier Williams, Sarah Jane Woodson Early, Hallie Quinn Brown, and Fanny Jackson Coppin.

Cooper was also present at the first Pan-African Conference in London, England, in 1900 and delivered a paper titled "The Negro Problem in America."

In a 1902 speech she said:

In 1914, at the age of 56, Cooper began courses for her doctoral degree at Columbia University, but was forced to interrupt her studies in 1915 when she adopted her late half-brother's five children upon their mother's death. Later on she transferred her credits to the University of Paris-Sorbonne, which did not accept her Columbia thesis, an edition of Le Pèlerinage de Charlemagne. Over a decade she researched and composed her dissertation, completing her coursework in 1924. Cooper defended her thesis "The Attitude of France on the Question of Slavery Between 1789 and 1848" in 1925. Cooper's retirement from Washington Colored High School in 1930 was by no means the end of her political activism. The same year she retired, she accepted the position of president at Frelinghuysen University, a school founded to provide classes for DC residents lacking access to higher education. Cooper worked for Frelinghuysen for twenty years, first as president and then as registrar, and left the school only a decade before her death in 1964 at the age of 105. At the age of 65, she became the fourth black woman in American history to earn a Doctor of Philosophy degree. Her work was eventually published in an anthology of medieval French literature, and was requested for classes and the bookstore at Harvard.

Frelinghuysen University
In 1929, Cooper was elected to succeed Jesse Lawson as president of Frelinghuysen University, a post which she assumed in 1930. Under Cooper's leadership in the 1930s, Frelinghuysen University focused on increasing literacy among the African American working poor and providing liberal arts and vocational education for unskilled workers. Karen A. Johnson writes in "In Service for the Common Good" Anna Julia Cooper and Adult Education that Cooper practiced a "decolonizing pedagogy", further saying:

After the university found servicing its mortgage prohibitive, she moved the institution to her own house. Cooper retired from her position as president in 1940, but she continued her involvement with the university, taking a position as its registrar.

Death
On February 27, 1964, Cooper died in Washington, D.C., at the age of 105. Her memorial was held in a chapel on the campus of Saint Augustine's College, in Raleigh, North Carolina, where her academic career began. She was buried alongside her husband at the City Cemetery in Raleigh.

Artistry

Writings
Although the alumni magazine of Cooper's undergraduate alma mater, Oberlin College, praised her in 1924, stating, "The class of '84 is honored in the achievement of this scholarly and colored alumna," when she tried to present her edition of Le Pèlerinage de Charlemagne to the college the next year, it was rejected.

Cooper's other writings include her autobiographical booklet The Third Step, about earning her doctorate from the Sorbonne, and a memoir about the Grimké Family, titled "The Early Years in Washington: Reminiscences of Life with the Grimkés," which appeared in Personal Recollections of the Grimké family and the Life and Writings of Charlotte Forten Grimké (privately published in 1951).

Works

 

 Translation of the author's 1925 doctoral thesis.

Legacy
Pages 24 and 25 of the 2016 United States passport contain the following quotation:
"The cause of freedom is not the cause of a race or a sect, a party or a class – it is the cause of humankind, the very birthright of humanity." – Anna Julia Cooper

In 2009, the United States Postal Service released a commemorative stamp in Cooper's honor.

Also in 2009, a tuition-free private middle school was opened and named in her honor – the Anna Julia Cooper Episcopal School on historic Church Hill in Richmond, Virginia.

Cooper is honored on the liturgical calendar of the Episcopal Church (USA) on February 28.

The Anna Julia Cooper Center on Gender, Race, and Politics in the South at Wake Forest University was established in Anna Cooper's honor. Melissa Harris-Perry is the founding director.

There is an Anna Julia Cooper Professor of Women's Studies at Spelman College.

Timeline 
1858: Born into slavery in Raleigh, North Carolina.
1877: Marries George A. C. Cooper.
1879: Husband dies and Anna is widowed at 21 years of age.
1887: Begins teaching math and Latin at the Preparatory School.
1891: Participates in the weekly "Saturday Circle" or "Saturday Nighters" salon of Black Washingtonians.
1892: Publishes "A Voice From The South By a Black Woman of the South". 
1892: Founded the Colored Women's League with Helen Appo Cook.
1893: Co-hosts anti-lynching activist Ida B. Wells with Frederick Douglass and Lucy Ellen Moten
1893: Becomes only woman elected to the American Negro Academy.
1893: Attends the World's Congress of Representative Women and reads paper titled "The Intellectual Progress of the Colored Women of the United States since the Emancipation Proclamation"
1900: Attends the First Pan-African Conference in London, reads paper titled "The Negro Problem in America", and joins the executive committee.
1901: Becomes second black female principal of M. Street High School.
1925: Earns doctorate from University of Paris, purchases home in LeDroit Park, begins hosting monthly "Les Amis de la Langue Francaise".
1929: Becomes second president of Frelinghuysen University in Washington, D.C.
1940: Becomes registrar of Frelinghuysen University and hosts classes in her LeDroit home.
1964: February 27, Anna J. Cooper dies in Washington D.C. at the age of 105.

See also

 African-American history
 African-American literature
 List of African-American writers
 List of Alpha Kappa Alpha sisters
 List of centenarians
 List of people on stamps of the United States
 List of feminist rhetoricians

Notes

References

Further reading

Special section on Anna Julia Cooper in the Spring 2009 issue of the African American Review:

External links

Essays by Anna J. Cooper at Quotidiana.org
Anna Julia Cooper - Digitized personal papers held by the Howard University

Works by Anna J. Cooper at Project Gutenberg
A Voice from the South at Project Gutenberg

1858 births
1964 deaths
African-American educators
American Episcopalians
American feminist writers
African-American feminists
Burials at City Cemetery (Raleigh, North Carolina)
Columbia University alumni
Oberlin College alumni
Writers from Raleigh, North Carolina
St. Augustine's University (North Carolina)
College of Sorbonne alumni
Writers from Washington, D.C.
Anglican saints
African-American Episcopalians
St. Augustine's University (North Carolina) alumni
American essayists
American women historians
American medievalists
Women medievalists
Activists from North Carolina
African-American centenarians
American centenarians
Academics from North Carolina
19th-century American slaves
African-American historians
Educators from Washington, D.C.
American women educators
Sexual slavery
Women centenarians
Literate American slaves
20th-century African-American women writers
20th-century American women writers
20th-century African-American writers
20th-century American historians
20th-century American academics
20th-century essayists
American women slaves